Obornella is a genus of fossil sea snails, marine gastropod mollusks in the family Pleurotomariidae, the slit snails, (according to the taxonomy of the Gastropoda by Bouchet & Rocroi, 2005).

Species 
Species within the genus Obornella include:
 Obornella granulata
 Obornella lakhaparensis 
 Orbornella plicopunctata 
 Obornella thompsonorum

References 

 Journal of Asian Earth Sciences 30(2):207-212. DOI:10.1016/j.jseaes.2006.07.016 
 Paleobiology database info
 M. G. Harasewych and S. Kiel. 2007. Upper Jurassic Pleurotomariidae (Gastropoda) from southwestern Madagascar. The Nautilus 121(2):76-89

Pleurotomariidae